The Croquet Game (French: 'La Partie de Croquet') is an 1873 oil on canvas painting by Édouard Manet, now in the Städel Museum in Frankfurt. It shows a group of people playing croquet, a very fashionable game at that time. The group comprises the painter Alfred Stevens, artists' models Victorine Meurent and Alice Legouvé  and, in the background, Manet's friend Paul Rodier.

In style this painting represented Manet's closest approach to impressionism. 

He had visited the theme of croquet before in 1871 with his painting Croquet at Boulogne

This paint was bought by the impressionist art collector Albert Hecht. After his death the paint passed to his daughter it:Suzanne Hecht Pontremoli.

Classification 
The Impressionists, including Édouard Manet, dealt intensively with plein air painting. Édouard Manet only took up the special challenge of this painting from 1870, after his artist colleague Berthe Morisot had suggested it. The garden is only shown very briefly. Floral details are missing. Compared to other impressionist plein air paintings, the picture appears static due to its well thought-out depth gradation.

References

Paintings by Édouard Manet
1873 paintings
Paintings in the collection of the Städel
Sports paintings
Croquet